Charles Montagu may refer to:

 Charles Montagu (of Boughton) (1564–1625), English MP for Higham Ferrers
 Charles Montagu, 1st Earl of Halifax (1661–1715), English poet and statesman
 Charles Montagu, 1st Duke of Manchester (c.1656–1722)
 Hon. Charles Montagu (died 1721) (c.1658–1721), Member of Parliament for Durham
 Charles Montagu (of Papplewick) (died 1759), Member of Parliament for Westminster, St. Germans, Camelford, Northampton and St. Albans
 Sir Charles Montagu (British Army officer) (died 1777), British general
 Lord Charles Montagu (1741–1784), Royal Governor of the Province of South Carolina
 Charles Montagu, 5th Baron Swaythling (born 1954)

See also
Charles Montagu-Scott, 4th Duke of Buccleuch (1772–1819)